Germany national bandy team is a bandy team competing for Germany in the international bandy and rink bandy tournaments. 

The German Empire national bandy team participated the 1913 European Bandy Championships in Davos.  

After a long time with no organised bandy in Germany, the German Bandy Federation (Deutscher Bandy-Bund) was established in June 2013 and the new national bandy team was formed in September 2013. In January 2014 the German team participated in the four nation bandy tournament in Davos, Switzerland, a centenary celebration of the 1913 European Championship. The other teams were Netherlands, Hungary, and Czech Republic. Germany made its debut in the World Championship in Irkutsk 2014. Before that they played a friendly match against the team of Obukhovo

19-20 September 2015 the team took part in a rink bandy tournament in Nymburk. The team also participated at the 2016 Davos Cup.

At the World Championship in 2016, the team won Division B and as a consequence thereof debuted in Division A at the 2017 tournament, where they finished 7th, thereby qualifying for 2018.

Tournament participation

World Championships
2014 – 15th place (7th in Division B)
2015 – 13th place (5th in Division B)
2016 – 9th place (1st in Division B)
2017 – 7th place
2018 – 7th place
2019 – 7th place

Current squad 
German squad at the 2014 World Championship in Irkutsk, Russia.

References

External links 
German Bandy Federation Official Homepage 

National bandy teams
Bandy
Bandy in Germany